Bukpa may refer to:

 Bukpa Hill, hill (363 m) in Kokshetau, Akmola Region, Kazakhstan
 Bukpa (river), a river in Kazakhstan
 Bukpa (newspaper), Bukpa is a regional newspaper in Kokshetau, published since 2001